Love Strange Love is a 1982 Brazilian erotic crime drama film written and directed by Walter Hugo Khouri. The film stars Vera Fischer, Tarcísio Meira and Xuxa Meneghel. Fischer won the Best Actress Award at the 15th Festival de Brasília as well as the Air France Award.

Plot
An older man wearing a business suit is dropped off at a mansion by his driver. He is alone as he starts wandering through the rooms of the mansion. It is apparently abandoned with empty rooms but has an aura of past opulence. The scene shifts to some 45 years earlier where a twelve year old boy is being escorted on foot from a train station by his grandmother. The older woman produces a letter and asks the boy to give it to his mother. They came near the gate of the same mansion the older man visited 45 years later, and the grandmother leaves the boy there. The gate is locked but a woman greets the boy. He gives her the letter, saying it is for his mother, and she lets him in. His grandmother, who has continued to watch discreetly from a distance, leaves the area once she knows he has been admitted. The younger woman escorts the boy into the house. The older man, who appears to have traveled back in time to observe, watches them although they apparently can't see him.

After they enter the house, another woman who appears to be serving as a business manager greets them. After being told about the letter for Anna, the boy's mother, the manager dispatches the first woman to find Anna. Meanwhile, many women in the house are hard at work preparing for what appears to be an important upcoming event, cleaning and arranging flowers. The boy is escorted off to a side room by the manager. She questions the boy who says that his grandmother left him there to stay with his mother. The grandmother is on her way back to Santa Catarina, Brazil. The manager seems shocked by the idea of the boy staying with his mother, but it isn't immediately clear why. Anna appears and embraces her son, commenting on how much more like a man he now is than he was the last time she saw him a year ago. The boy apparently usually lives with his grandmother, not Anna.

The boy waits in the foyer as preparations for the event continue. There are a large number of attractive women in the house, some of whom comment on or make flirtatious glances in the boy's direction. Meanwhile, Anna discusses the letter with the manager. In the letter, the grandmother--Anna's mother--has various complaints about Anna. The primary issue, though, seems to be that Anna generally provides full support for the Santa Catarina household. Anna's mother is angry that no money has been forthcoming for the last few months, a shortfall Anna attributes to having recently bought a house. As Anna and the manager continue to talk, it becomes increasingly apparent that the large mansion they are in may serve as some kind of brothel. The mansion is owned by someone named Dr. Osmar, and the women apparently make a lot of money off of Dr. Osmar and other wealthy men. Dr. Osmar is currently most attracted to Anna, although he was formerly interested in the manager. This is the reason why Anna is now wealthy enough to buy a house herself as well as support her mother's household in Santa Catarina.

As the activities in the house are illegal, it is dangerous to allow a twelve year old boy to stay there. But Anna has no local family to send him to. They can return the boy--with some money to appease Anna's mother--to Santa Catarina, but need a plan for what to do until after the upcoming event. Meanwhile, in the foyer, one of the women approaches the boy, makes eyes at him, and then returns to a group of women standing on the balcony. The boy looks very self conscious. The manager--now referred to as the brothel's madam--summons a woman named Therese and instructs her to create a makeshift bedroom for the boy in the attic. Anna then escorts the boy past the group of women on the balcony, who continue to snigger at the thought of a young boy staying there. Anna scolds them for this. Anna takes the boy to her room, which appears especially opulent. The boy seems to recognize there is something unusual about the house, but is too innocent so far to realize its true nature. Anna identifies the madam as Laura, saying only vaguely that the women help Laura with various things. They discuss the letter and the trip, where apparently Anna's mother was complaining about money. Anna's mother also had some unspecified complaints about the boy's behavior. Anna tells the boy to take a bath and change clothes.

After the boy--Hugo--finishes his bath, Anna gives him a towel. He covers his private parts as he emerges from the bath, and Anna says it is now her turn. The same woman who had been previously eyeing Hugo approaches his room. She opens her robe to reveal full frontal nudity. Hugo's eyes widen but he soon closes the door. Hugo then spies on Anna as she is taking her bath, observing Anna nude. The scene switches back briefly to the older man reflecting back on the past. Anna then escorts Hugo to his space in the attic. They pass a young, topless, woman and the woman and Anna glare at each other. In the attic, Anna promises Hugo that eventually they will have their own house together, but that Hugo might have to return to his grandmother for a short time. This upsets Hugo. Someone--possibly Dr. Osmar--arrives and Anna leaves. Shortly after, Hugo observes the topless woman, Tamara, being instructed as to the role she must play for a new customer. She is to take on the role of an innocent virgin who speaks mostly German and is therefore not that communicative in Portuguese, the language the characters mostly speak in Brazil.

Anna and Laura then talk on the patio with Dr. Osmar, who arrived earlier. Dr. Osmar is a major political figure preparing for the Brazilian election then scheduled for Jan 3, 1938. To win the election, however, he needs an alliance with another man who is coming to the brothel a little later as a client. The prospective ally likes to present a Puritan image. The plan appears to be to show the man a good time, but put him at risk of future blackmail so that he feels some pressure to agree to the alliance. The potential ally is to be offered the chance to sleep with Tamara, who is said to always sexually feel like a virgin even though she is not. That is why she will be able to get away with claiming to be a virgin. Dr. Osmar is offered the chance to sleep with Tamara first, with Laura mentioning that if she is wrong she can always get a refund from the brothel Tamara is on loan from. Tamara then arrives on the patio. She wants to work permanently in this brothel, but to do so would need to relocate her entire family, and she wants Dr. Osmar's help on this.

Anna and Dr. Osmar then have sex for an extended period while Hugo watches--from his vantage point in the attic Hugo appears to be able to spy on activities in a number of rooms in the house. Witnessing Anna having sex, Hugo seems to realize for the first time the true nature of the house and his mother's line of work, and starts crying. After sex, Anna and Dr. Osmar listen to a radio broadcast about the growing fascist alliance of the time between Hitler and Mussolini, implying that Dr. Osmar is a would-be leader of a Brazilian fascist government that would ally with the Axis if given the chance. The woman who has previously shown interest in Hugo arrives in the attic, complaining that all the men who patronize the brothel are slimy characters and implying she wants the chance to have sex with someone more wholesome like Hugo. She undresses and Hugo starts fondling her breasts. After another woman approaches and starts crying, for unknown reasons, she retreats to the roof. Soon after she comes back, puts her robe back on, and leaves.

Dr. Osmar talks with Anna about his need to be increasingly discreet when it comes to any association with the brothel. There will be increasing focus on his activities until after the election. He has asked Laura not to send anyone from the brothel to his office. He talks about the great uncertainty of the times, but says he will still provide Anna with a house. This appears to create some dispute with Anna. She wants a house, but would prefer the small house that she is purchasing herself but that she will own outright to a rented mansion provided by Dr. Osmar.

The planned event then begins that evening. A live band has been hired to provide entertainment. A group of mostly well dressed men arrives at the party in two cars. Their apparent leader, a man wearing a tuxedo, is introduced to other guests as Dr. Benicio, the prospective political ally of Dr. Osmar. A group of women work on getting Tamara ready for her encounter with Dr. Benicio as Hugo continues to take in events from his upstairs vantage point. One of Dr. Osmar's associates receives a call suggesting a potential threat to his plans, but Dr. Osmar goes ahead with a speech announcing the political alliance and what it means for the future of Brazil. Tamara asks Hugo, who is watching her, to come over. She says that she is dressing the way she is due to her being a present for someone, presumably Dr. Benicio. Tamara also invites Hugo to fondle her bare breasts, which he does. Dr. Benicio expresses his appreciation for the invitation to the event, commenting that it is rare that he gets invited to such events--it is unclear as yet whether he realizes this is a brothel. Hugo continues to fondle Tamara until Anna arrives and angrily dispatches Hugo back to the attic. Anna tells Hugo that she has to work in this job for a little while longer because the world runs on money and she needs the money so they can have a good life. Anna instructs Hugo to get ready for bed, stay in the attic, and not talk to anyone.

Dr. Osmar continues to discuss the potential alliance with the other men. Soon a large crate wrapped up as a present is brought into the party and described as a present for Dr. Benicio. Someone--presumably Tamara--in a teddy bear costume emerges from the crate and gradually begins to undress. Hugo continues to watch from above. Hugo finds some kind of hidden crawlway or space with a way to descend to a lower level where he is able to more closely witness various prostitutes having sex with men. Tamara then retreats to a private room with Dr. Benicio. The resourceful Hugo finds his way into a crawlspace adjacent to their room to spy on them, but isn't entirely quiet, making some noise that attracts the attention of Dr. Benicio. Dr. Benicio investigates, putting his hand into the crawlspace, but is seemingly unable to touch or see Hugo. Still, he remains suspicious, perhaps thinking they are bugged, and asks Tamara what is going on. Tamara then feigns little knowledge of Portuguese, retreating into German. Dr. Benicio then openly voices his suspicions, mentioning a friend who was photographed having sex in order to blackmail him, and wondering if the same thing is happening to him. Tamara tries to reassure him that they only want to please him, but he pushes her away.

Dr. Osmar, in bed with Anna, expresses confidence that his plan will work. Meanwhile Hugo moves from spying on Tamara to spying on Anna, enjoying Anna's increasing physical arousal. Hugo returns to his attic and goes to bed, dreaming of sex with first one woman and then a group of about six women. He starts to masturbate while in bed to these images.

The next morning an associate of Dr. Osmar arrives at the house. In an angry and urgent mood, he demands to speak with Dr. Osmar, who is still in bed with Anna. Once Dr. Osmar is roused from sleep, he is told that some kind of coup, similar to 1932, has happened. Dr. Osmar tells Anna that the coup will likely lead to his needing to go to France in exile, but he expresses hope it could be a happy exile with Anna. He writes Anna a check and says they will talk more in the afternoon. Tamara gets dressed and leaves the room of Dr. Benicio who remains fully dressed. She goes up to the attic, undresses, and climbs into bed with Hugo. They start having engaging in foreplay. Dr. Osmar wakes Dr. Benicio and tells him about the coup, saying he must leave. As Tamara prepares to mount Hugo and have sex with him in the cowgirl position, Anna approaches. Tamara quickly gets out of bed and puts her robe back on. It is still obvious to Anna what has been going on, and she fights Tamara, slapping her several times. Dr. Osmar, Dr. Benicio, and the men who work for them then leave the house in a hurry.

Anna tells Hugo that he will need to return to his grandmother, although Anna will send her mother more money. Anna says that staying in the brothel wouldn't be good for Hugo, but he has trouble understanding and starts to cry. Anna tries to comfort him, then removes her robe revealing her nude body to Hugo. Anna then allows her son Hugo to make love to her. A political figure, apparently newly empowered by the coup, arrives at the house and somewhat vaguely promises to continue to protect the brothel from the law. A car arrives to return Hugo to his grandmother's house in Santa Catarina. The scene shifts back to the present day, where it is revealed that the older man in the house is donating the house to charity. He seems, himself, to be a very senior figure politically being referred to as "Your Excellency". In the film's final scene, the older man reveals that the young Hugo is his younger self from 45 years earlier.

Cast
 Vera Fischer as Anna
 Tarcísio Meira as Dr. Osmar
 Xuxa Meneghel as Tamara
 Íris Bruzzi as Laura
 Walter Forster as Hugo (Adult)
 Marcelo Ribeiro as Hugo (Child)
 Mauro Mendonça as Dr. Benicio

Production
Marcelo Ribeiro said that unlike his first movie Eros, o Deus do Amor when they put duct tape on his privates because he couldn't control himself, in this film's sex scenes he had a normal nude. "I learned to separate what was work and what was intimate. But of course there's always a little joke, an awkward situation... The film set is very mystical, you never know what might happen," he said.

Reception
In the criticism of the website Filmes do Chico, it is stated that "because it was associated with Xuxa as a pedophile, the film gained a fame that does not correspond to the material it offers." Like all of Khouri's films, Amor, Estranho Amor has many sex scenes, a lot of free nudity, but, putting the drops on the is, it's a good movie."

Controversy

Love Strange Love caused some controversy due to the participation of Xuxa in the cast. In an interview, Xuxa explained that she was between 17 and 19 years old when the film was made. In another interview Xuxa comments that the film was made in 1979. Her character has sexual relations with a boy of 12 years, interpreted by the actor Marcelo Ribeiro. As in the contract there was no release of the image for video, Xuxa, through a judicial injunction, ordered to collect all the original tapes of stores and stores of the country, nevertheless 4,000 copies were sold before the Justice to distribute its distribution, being, therefore, many pirate copies continued circulating, making of the film a true legend among people who did not know the work.

The video of Love Strange Love has its marketing and distribution prohibited in the country. However, the film was released on DVD in the United States in 2005 and can be purchased by any Brazilian on foreign import sites. The US producer did not sell the rights to Xuxa, who filed a lawsuit in the US in 1993, but lost. In 2006, Marcelo Ribeiro was found at 39 and gave several interviews, and also published a book on how everything happened at the time, including conversations behind the scenes with the actress.

In 2007, taking advantage of its momentary popularity, it made a pornographic film. In 2007, Marcelo Ribeiro, then at age 40, gives an interview where he comments on the film's controversy. In 2007, the entire film became available in 5 parts and uncut. No legal action has yet been taken on the case. In 2011, producer Anibal Massaine fights in justice in the attempt to commercialize the film, taking advantage of the fame of the artist. In 2014, Xuxa lost a lawsuit it filed against Google to create a filter in order to eliminate results related to the movie in its search engine. Xuxa filed an appeal against that decision, but in 2017, the appeal was denied.

Awards

References

External links
 

1982 films
1982 crime drama films
1980s erotic drama films
1980s Portuguese-language films
Brazilian crime drama films
Brazilian erotic drama films
Films about pedophilia
Films about prostitution in Brazil
Films directed by Walter Hugo Khouri
Films set in 1937
Films set in São Paulo
Films shot in São Paulo
Incest in film
Obscenity controversies in film